The Langkaih is a river of western Mizoram, northeastern India. The river flows in a northerly direction, joining the Barak River in the Cachar plain of Assam.

References

Rivers of Mizoram
Rivers of India